Ton van Engelen (born 4 October 1950 in Den Bosch) is a retired Dutch footballer who was active as a goalkeeper.

Football career
Van Engelen made his professional debut for PSV Eindhoven, with whom he won a league title and a UEFA Cup medal. He also played for Feyenoord and Go Ahead Eagles.

Cycling
After his football career, he became a soigneur for various Dutch cycling teams. Since 1996 he has been working for the Rabobank team and in 2007 he was honoured by the organiser for being active in his twentieth Tour de France.

Personal life
He is the father of Yvo van Engelen.

Honours
PSV
Eredivisie: 1
 1977-78
UEFA Cup: 1
 1977–78
Feyenoord
KNVB Cup: 1
 1979–80

 First match: 29 September 1976 : PSV Eindhoven - Dundalk FC, 6-0

References

External links
 Profile - Feyenoord
 Profile - Team Lotto-Jumbo

1950 births
Living people
People from Heusden
Footballers from North Brabant
Association football goalkeepers
Dutch footballers
PSV Eindhoven players
Feyenoord players
Go Ahead Eagles players
Eredivisie players 
UEFA Cup winning players
Cycling people